Berl is a given name and surname.

Given name
Berl Broder (1817–1868), Ukrainian Jewish singer
Berl Huffman (1907–1990), American multi-sport coach
Berl Katznelson (1887–1944), founder of Labor Zionism
Berl Kutchinsky (1935–1995), Danish Professor of Criminology
Berl Locker (1887–1972), Zionist activist and Israeli politician
Berl Priebe (1918–2014), American farmer and politician
Berl Repetur (1902–1989), Zionist activist and Israeli politician
Berl Senofsky (1926−2002), American classical violinist and teacher

Surname
Emmanuel Berl (1892–1976), French journalist, historian and essayist
Beit Berl (Hebrew: בֵּית בֶּרְל, lit. Berl House), village in Israel
Christine Berl (born 1943), American composer, pianist, and Egyptian-style Oriental dancer

See also
Berl., taxonomic author abbreviation for Augusto Napoleone Berlese (1864–1903), Italian botanist and mycologist
Lucy Burle (born 1955), Brazilian international freestyle and butterfly swimmer
Berle (surname)
Burl (disambiguation)